Buridrillia panarica is an extinct species of sea snail, a marine gastropod mollusk in the family Pseudomelatomidae.

Distribution
Fossils of this marine species were found in West Panama and in Pliocene strata of Costa Rica and Ecuador; age range: 3.6 to 2.588 Ma

References

 Olsson, Axel Adolf. "Tertiary and Quaternary fossils from the Burica Peninsula of Panama and Costa Rica." (1942): 153–258.
 Olsson, Axel Adolf. Neogene mollusks from northwestern Ecuador. Paleontological research institution, 1964.

External links
 
 Fossilworks: Buridrillia panarica

panarica
Gastropods described in 1942